Mauch Chunk station or Jim Thorpe station could refer to:

 Jim Thorpe station (Lehigh Valley Railroad)
 Mauch Chunk station (Central Railroad of New Jersey)